The 12 Metre was a sailing event on the Sailing at the 1912 Summer Olympics program in Nynäshamn.  Two races were scheduled plus eventual sail-off's. 27 sailors, on 3 boats, from 3 nations entered.

Race schedule

Course area and course configuration 
For the 12-Metre Course A was used.

Weather conditions

Final results 
The 1912 Olympic scoring system was used. All competitors were male.

Daily standings

Other information

Prizes 

The helmsman of the winning yacht received a gold medal, with the members of the crew receiving silver-gilt medals. For second and third place, the helmsman and crew all received silver (for second) or bronze (for third) medals. The International Olympic Committee considers all crew members of the winning yacht to be gold medalists.

The following Commemorative Plaque were handed out by the Royal Swedish Yacht Club to the owners of:

Further reading

References 

Sailing at the 1912 Summer Olympics
12-metre class